Iotyrris musivum is a species of sea snail, a marine gastropod mollusk in the family Turridae, the turrids.

Description
The length of the shell attains 12.6 mm.

Distribution
This marine species occurs off Vanuatu.

References

External links

 Kantor, Y.I.; Puillandre, N.; Olivera, B.M.; Bouchet, P. (2008). Morphological proxies for taxonomic decision in turrids (Mollusca, Neogastropoda): a test of the value of shell and radula characters using molecular data. Zoological Science, 25(11): 1156–1170
 Abdelkrim, J.; Aznar-Cormano, L.; Buge, B.; Fedosov, A.; Kantor, Y.; Zaharias, P.; Puillandre, N. (2018). Delimiting species of marine gastropods (Turridae, Conoidea) using RAD sequencing in an integrative taxonomy framework. Molecular Ecology. 27(22): 4591–4611

musivum
Gastropods described in 2008